Cameron Peck (born July 10, 1991) is an American professional golfer from Olympia, Washington.

Biography
Peck was born in Honolulu, Hawaii. He attended Timberline High School in Lacey, Washington.

Peck won the 2008 U.S. Junior Amateur. He was named the 2008 AJGA and Rolex Junior Player of the Year and was the recipient of the 2009 Byron Nelson International Junior Golf Award. He played college golf at Texas A&M University.

In May 2015, he won a playoff at the PGA Tour Canada Qualifying School, to earn his card on that tour.

Amateur wins
2008 U.S. Junior Amateur, AJGA FootJoy Championship, AJGA HP Championship at Bay Hill, Wellstone Communities Junior at Craig Ranch
2013 Washington State Amateur, Pacific Northwest Amateur

U.S. national team appearances
Amateur
Junior Ryder Cup: 2008 (winners)

References

External links
Profile on Texas A&M's official site

American male golfers
Texas A&M Aggies men's golfers
Golfers from Honolulu
Golfers from Washington (state)
People from Lacey, Washington
1991 births
Living people